Sistine Rose Stallone (born June 27, 1998) is an American actress and model. She made her acting debut as Nicole in the survival horror film 47 Meters Down: Uncaged, directed by Johannes Roberts.

Early life and education
Sistine Stallone was born in 1998 as the second daughter of actor Sylvester Stallone and former model Jennifer Flavin. Stallone and her sisters were Golden Globe Ambassadors at the 75th Golden Globe Awards in January, 2018. 

In 2018, she began attending University of Southern California to pursue a degree in communications.

Career
In 2016, she signed to IMG Models, and made her first appearance at a fashion show for Chanel. She appeared in a July 2016 issue of Glamour and was featured on the cover of Elle Russia for November 2017.

Filmography

Film

References

External links

American actresses
1998 births
American people of French descent
American people of Italian descent
American female models
Living people
Family of Sylvester Stallone